Dennis Price (1915–1973) was an English actor. He made his professional debut at the Queen's Theatre in September 1937 alongside John Gielgud in Richard II. He appeared in several films produced by Ealing Studios and the Boulting brothers. Between 1965 and 1967, he appeared in the BBC television series The World of Wooster, where his performance as Jeeves was described in The Times as "an outstanding success".
He also appeared in The Invisible Man (1958 TV series), in the 1958 episode, 'Behind the Mask'.

Filmography

No Parking (1938) as Extra (uncredited)
A Canterbury Tale (1944) as Peter Gibbs
A Place of One's Own (1945) as Dr. Selbie
The Echo Murders (1945) as Dick Warren
Caravan (1946) as Sir Francis Castleton
The Magic Bow (1946) as Paul de la Rochelle
Hungry Hill (1947) as Greyhound John
Dear Murderer (1947) as Richard Fenton
Holiday Camp (1947) as Sq. Ldr. Hardwick
Jassy (1947) as Christopher Hatton
Master of Bankdam (1947) as Joshua Crowther
The White Unicorn (1947) as Richard Glover
Easy Money (1948) as Joe Henty
Snowbound (1948) as Neil Blair
Good-Time Girl (1948) as Michael 'Red' Farrell
The Bad Lord Byron (1949) as Lord Byron
Kind Hearts and Coronets (1949) as Louis / Louis's father
Helter Skelter (1949) as Lord Byron (uncredited)
The Lost People (1949) as Ridley
The Dancing Years (1950) as Rudi Kleiber
Murder Without Crime (1950) as Matthew, Stephen's Landlord
The Adventurers (1951) as Clive Hunter
I'll Never Forget You (1951) as Tom Pettigrew
Lady Godiva Rides Again (1951) as Simon Abott
The Magic Box (1951) as Harold
Song of Paris (1952) as Matthew Ibbetson
The Tall Headlines (1952) as Maurice Fletcher
Noose for a Lady (1953) as Simon Gale
Murder at 3am (1953) as Inspector Peter Lawton
The Intruder (1953) as Leonard Pirry
Time Is My Enemy (1954) as Martin Radley
For Better, for Worse (1954) as Debenham
That Lady (1955) as Mateo Vasquez
Oh... Rosalinda!! (1955) as Maj. Frank
Private's Progress (1956) as Brig. Bertram Tracepurcel
Charley Moon (1956) as Harold Armytage
Port Afrique (1956) as Robert Blackton
A Touch of the Sun (1956) as Digby Hatchard
Fortune Is a Woman (1957) as Tracey Moreton
The Naked Truth (1957) as Nigel Dennis
Danger Within (1959) as Capt. Rupert Callender
I'm All Right Jack (1959) as Bertram Tracepurcel
Don't Panic Chaps! (1959) as Krisling
School for Scoundrels (1960) as Dunstan
Oscar Wilde (1960) as Robert Ross
Tunes of Glory (1960) as Major Charles Scott, M.C.
Piccadilly Third Stop (1960) as Edward
The Millionairess (1960) as Dr. Adrian Bland
The Pure Hell of St Trinian's (1960) as Gore Blackwood
Five Golden Hours (1961) as Raphael
No Love for Johnnie (1961) as Flagg
The Rebel (1961) as Jim Smith
Double Bunk (1961) as Watson
Watch it, Sailor! (1961) as Lt. Cmdr Hardcastle
Victim (1961) as Calloway
What a Carve Up! (1961) as Guy Broughton
Play It Cool (1962) as Sir Charles Bryant
The Pot Carriers (1962) as Smooth Tongue
Go to Blazes (1962) as Withers
Behave Yourself (1962)
Kill or Cure (1962) as Dr. Julian Crossley
The Amorous Prawn (1962) as Prawn (Mr. Vernon)
The Cool Mikado (1963) as Ronald Fortescue
The Wrong Arm of the Law (1963) as Educated Ernest (uncredited)
The V.I.P.s (1963) as Cmdr. Millbank
The Cracksman (1963) as Grantley
Doctor in Distress (1963) as Dr. Blacker
Tamahine (1963) as Charles Poole
Murder Most Foul (1964) as Harris Tumbrill
A Jolly Bad Fellow (1964) as Dr. John Hughes
The Horror of It All (1964) as Cornwallis Marley
The Comedy Man (1964) as Tommy Morris
The Earth Dies Screaming (1964) as Quinn Taggart
Curse of the Voodoo (1965) as Maj. Lomas
A High Wind in Jamaica (1965) as Mathias
Ten Little Indians (1965) as Dr. Armstrong
Just like a Woman (1967) as Bathroom Salesman
Jules Verne's Rocket to the Moon (1967) as The Duke of Barset
The Haunted House of Horror (1969) as Inspector Bill Bradley
Venus in Furs (1969) as Percival Kapp
The Magic Christian (1969) as Winthrop
Some Will, Some Won't (1970) as Benson
The Horror of Frankenstein (1970) as The Graverobber
The Rise and Rise of Michael Rimmer (1970) as Fairburn
Vampyros Lesbos (1971) as Dr. Alwin Seward
Twins of Evil (1971) as Dietrich
Tower of Evil (1972) as Bakewell
Pulp (1972) as The Englishman
The Adventures of Barry McKenzie (1972) as Mr. Gort
Dracula, Prisoner of Frankenstein (1972) as Doctor Frankenstein
Alice's Adventures in Wonderland (1972) as King of Hearts
That's Your Funeral (1972) as Eugene Soul
Go for a Take (1972) as Dracula, actor
Theatre of Blood (1973) as Hector Snipe
Horror Hospital (1973) as Mr. Pollack
The Erotic Rites of Frankenstein (1973) as Doctor Frankenstein 
Quartier de femmes (1974) as L'avocat Linsday 
Son of Dracula (1974) as Van Helsing

References

External links
 Dennis Price at the BFI
 
 
 

Male actor filmographies
British filmographies